Guillaume de Nangis (died 1300), also known as William of Nangis, was a French chronicler.

William was a monk in the Abbey of St.-Denis to the north of Paris. About 1285 he was placed in charge of the abbey library as custos cartarum, and he died in June or July 1300. Having doubtless done some work on the Latin manuscripts on which the Grandes Chroniques de France are based, William wrote a long Chronicon, dealing with the history of the world from the creation until 1300. For the period before 1113 this work  merely repeats that of Sigebert of Gembloux and others; but after this date it contains some new and valuable material. The chronicle had later continuations by other authors, though the so-called "second continuation",  by  Jean de Venette, which takes events up to 1368, was not a continuation of the Chronicon but rather an independent chronicle that happened to be bound into the same manuscript as the Nangis chronicle.

William's other writings are: Gesta Ludovici IX; Gesta Philippi  III, sive Audacis; Chronicon abbreviatum regum Francorum; and a French translation of the same work written for the laity. Making use of the large store of manuscripts at Saint Denis, William was a compiler rather than an author, and with the exception of the latter part of the Chronicon his writings do not add materially to our knowledge of the time. In his Gesta Ludovici IX he included a letter from Sempad the Constable to Henry I of Cyprus. Among his major sources for the reign of Louis IX was the lost Latin chronicle of Primat of Saint-Denis.

Both his chronicles, however, became very popular and found several continuators, Jean de Joinville being among those who made use of the Chronicon. This work from 1113 to 1300, with continuations to 1368, has been edited by H. Géraud for the Société de l'histoire de France (Paris, 1843), and practically all William's writings are found in the twentieth volume of Martin Bouquet's Recueil des historiens des Gaules et de la France (Paris, 1738–1876). A French translation of the Chronicon is in Guizot's Collection des mémoires relatifs à l'histoire de France (Paris, 1823–1835).

Notes

References
August Potthast, Bibliotheca historica (Berlin, 1896).
Auguste Molinier, Les sources de l'histoire de France, tome III (Paris, 1903).
Gabrielle M. Spiegel, The chronicle tradition of Saint-Denis (Brookline and Leiden, 1978), pp. 98–108.

External links
 Guillaume de Nangis (ed. H. Géraud, 1843), Chronicon , volume 1 (including the Chronicon, an introduction in French, and part of a continuation up to 1368) and 2 (including the rest of the continuation)
 Guillaume de Nangis, Chronique, online Guizot's 1825 edition published by J.L.J. Brière, on Gallica Or: contemporary electronic edition after Guizot's, on Wikisource 
 Online volume 20 of Martin Bouquet's Recueil des historiens des Gaules et de la France on Gallica 

French chroniclers
13th-century French historians
French Benedictines
1300 deaths
Philip IV of France
Year of birth unknown